Schwaz Heliport  is a public use heliport located 15 nm north-northwest of Schwaz, Tirol, Austria.

See also
List of airports in Austria

References

External links 
 Airport record for Schwaz Heliport at Landings.com

Airports in Austria
Buildings and structures in Tyrol (state)
Transport in Tyrol (state)